Aleksandr Logunov may refer to:

 Aleksandr Logunov (footballer) (born 1996), Russian football player
 Aleksandr Logunov (mathematician), Russian mathematician